The Aberdare Urban District Council was established in 1894 and covered the parish of Aberdare. Its responsibilities included public health, sanitation, roads and public works generally.

There were five wards, namely Aberaman (also known as No. 5 Ward), Blaengwawr (also known as No. 4 Ward), Gadlys (also known as No. 2 Ward), Llwydcoed (also known as No. 1 Ward), and the Town Ward (also known as No. 3 Ward).  Originally, one member was elected from each ward on an annual basis, but from 1904 an additional member was granted to each ward resulting in the election of ten members, out of a total of twenty, every three years. At the intervening election, one member continued to be elected.

An election was held in April 1904. It was preceded by the 1903 election and followed by the 1905 election. The term of office of members elected at the 1901 election came to an end and those elected were to serve until 1907.

In line with an increase in the population a number of additional seats had been granted by the County Council.

(*) denotes sitting member

Results

Aberaman Ward (two seats)

Blaengwawr Ward (two seats)

Gadlys Ward

Llwydcoed Ward (two seats)

Town Ward (two seats)

References

Bibliography
 
 
 

1904
1904 Welsh local elections